Salvador Barajas del Toro (born 8 May 1972) is a Mexican politician affiliated with the PRI. He currently serves as Deputy of the LXII Legislature of the Mexican Congress representing Jalisco. He also served as deputy during the LX Legislature.

References

1972 births
Living people
Politicians from Jalisco
Institutional Revolutionary Party politicians
21st-century Mexican politicians
Deputies of the LXII Legislature of Mexico
Members of the Chamber of Deputies (Mexico) for Jalisco